Antiloop were a Swedish electronic dance music duo, formed in Lidingö in 1994 by David Westerlund and Robin Söderman. They won two Swedish Grammis Awards and six Swedish Dance Music Awards.

Biography

Early career (1974–1994) 
Robin Staffan Mark Söderman (born 22 January 1974) and David Olof Westerlund (born 8 July 1977) both grew up in Lidingö in Stockholm, Sweden. Robin's father and uncle were musicians and helped grow his interest. . David started play synth at an age of four and later played in a big band jazz at youth age. Söderman started a band and invited his childhood friend Westerlund, along with some other that he knew. The other members left the band and it was only Westerlund and Söderman left. They began to play in Nightclubs as DJs and eventually decided to make their own music.

Antiloop (1994–2002) 
Antiloop was formed 1994. The name comes both from the animal antelope, which in Swedish is spelled: "Antilop", and the music element loop.

A third member, the dancer Maxim, was also member of the band but he left early.

Antiloop debuted in 1995 with the EP: N.S.F.M.C (Not Suitable For Mass Consumption). In 1997, they released their debut album LP. Five singles were released from the album, which all peaked at under 45 in the Swedish chart.  A year later they released the remix album Remixed, including the single "Believe". Antiloop released their second and final studio album in 2000, Fastlane People. The song "Catch Me" on the album features the Swedish rapper Timbuktu on vocals.  The songs "Only U" and "Let Your Body Free" appear in the film Lilja 4-ever (2002) by Lukas Moodysson. In 2002 they released a compilation album titled At The Rebel's Room that includes two discs; one containing their most popular songs, and another made of remixes of their songs by other artists. Antiloop produced several remixes for the  Scandinavian group Aqua, including one for the Doctor Jones CD single. They have released songs and remixes under the aliases Face and The Buckwheat Rebels.

Antiloop disbanded in 2002 with their website eventually expiring shortly after. In 2005 David Westerlund began producing music by himself under the name "David West".

Discography

Studio albums

Extended plays

Remix albums

Compilation albums

Singles

Awards

Swedish Grammis Awards

|-
| 1998
| LP
| Årets modern dans (The year's best contemporary dance)
| 
|-
| 2001
| Fastlane People
| Årets Klubb/Dans (The year's best club/Dance)
| 
|-

Swedish Dance Music Awards 

|-
| 1997
| Antiloop
| Best House/Techno Act
| 
|-
| 1998
| Antiloop
| Best Modern Dance
| 
|-
| 1998
| Antiloop
| Best House/Techno Act
| 
|-
| 1998
| LP
| Best Dance Album
| 
|-
| 1998
| "In My Mind"
| Best Dance Single
| 
|-
| 1998
| Antiloop
| Best Dance Artist/Group
| 
|-

References

External links
Complete discography at Discogs.com

Swedish electronic music groups
Swedish trance music groups
Electronic music duos
Swedish house music groups
Drum and bass duos
DJ duos
Swedish dance music groups
Swedish DJs
Remixers
Musical groups from Stockholm
Musical groups established in 1994
Musical groups disestablished in 2002
1994 establishments in Sweden
Electronic dance music DJs